Luther Johnson (July 19, 1903 South Bend, Indiana – April 12, 1978 South Bend, Indiana) was an American racecar driver.

Indy 500 results

Indianapolis 500 drivers
1903 births
1978 deaths
Sportspeople from South Bend, Indiana
Racing drivers from Indiana